Shanklin is a seaside resort and civil parish on the Isle of Wight, England, located on Sandown Bay. Shanklin is the southernmost of three settlements which occupy the bay, and is close to Lake  Sandown. The sandy beach, its Old Village and a wooded ravine, Shanklin Chine, are its main attractions. The esplanade along the beach is occupied by hotels and restaurants for the most part, and is one of the most tourist-oriented parts of the town. The other is the Old Village, at the top of Shanklin Chine.
Together with Lake and Sandown to the north, Shanklin forms a built up area of 21,374 inhabitants (2011).

Shopping

The main shopping centre consists of two roads, Regent Street and High Street, which together comprise the largest retail area in the south of the Isle of Wight; significant for tourists but also as an amenity for residents.

Near Regent Street are the town's two main supermarkets, the Co-op and Lidl. In Regent Street itself are many local shops, including two arts and crafts shops, several clothing and sports shops, three newsagents and three bakeries. The High Street also has some local shops, but is dominated by tourist shops and restaurants.

Transport
Shanklin railway station is the terminus of the Island Line from Ryde, opened on 23 August 1864. The railway was extended south to Ventnor in 1866, but this section was closed in 1966. The line from Ryde to Shanklin is now operated by former London Underground tube trains. In October 2004 a direct link was revived in the form of a bus service named the "Rail link". This was discontinued in 2010 but was replaced by the Southern Vectis number 3 bus.

Bus services to nearby towns and suburbs are run by Southern Vectis, mainly on routes 2, 3, 22 and 24, principally from the bus stands at the Co-op supermarket. Destinations served include Newchurch, Newport, Ryde, Sandown, Ventnor and Winford. In the summer, an open top bus route called "The Sandown Bay Tour" is run, serving the main tourist areas of Shanklin and running to Sandown.

Culture

Shanklin has one theatre, Shanklin Theatre, which is just off the top end of the High Street.

In July and August 1819 the poet John Keats lodged at Eglantine Cottage in the resort's High Street, where he completed the first book of Lamia and began a drama, Otho the Great, with his friend Charles Armitage Brown.

In July 1868 the American poet Henry Wadsworth Longfellow stayed at the Crab Inn in Shanklin's Old Village during his last visit to Europe and left a poem about it on a stone by the pub. It is not generally held to be amongst his best work..

The 1980s indiepop band Trixie's Big Red Motorbike were from Shanklin, and recorded some of their records there.

Victoria Cross recipient and Deputy Governor of the Isle of Wight, Colonel Henry Gore-Browne retired to Shanklin before his death in 1912.

According to Joseph Jacobs's influential 1890 version of The Three Little Pigs, the Three Pigs and the Wolf live near Shanklin.

In Monty Python's Flying Circus, season 4, "Mr Neutron", Michael Palin plays a US commander who calls upon "Moscow! Peking! and Shanklin, Isle of Wight!". A voice over continues "And so the Great Powers and the people of Shanklin, Isle of Wight, drew their net in ever-tightening circles around the most dangerous threat to peace the world has ever faced."

Beaches & Esplanade

Shanklin is on the coast of Sandown Bay, and therefore is part of the long beach which spans between Yaverland in the north to Luccombe in the south. The section of beach situated next to Shanklin is split into Small Hope Beach and Hope Beach. Above Hope Beach is the esplanade which boasts some traditional seaside attractions including an amusement arcade, a crazy golf course, and a children's play area, with slides, ball pools, bouncy castles, rigging, swings etc. available to be hired for a child's birthday party. There are several seafront hotels, a cliff lift from the seafront to the top of the cliff, a putting course, several cafes and restaurants and pubs, and a large, clean beach. Shanklin used to have a pier, but this was destroyed in the Great Storm of 1987. The pier formerly had a theatre at which many famous performers appeared, including Paul Robeson, Richard Tauber and Arthur Askey (whose daughter attended a local boarding school called Upper Chine School for Girls). The Summerland Amusement Arcade on the seafront was formerly a seaplane hangar positioned at Bembridge where it housed Fairey Campania seaplanes of the Nizam of Hyderabad's Squadron. Large areas of the seafront were severely damaged or destroyed during the Bombing raids of World War II, but were quickly rebuilt after the war, causing the current seafront to be a varied mixture of Victorian, inter-war and post-war architecture.

Shanklin Sailing Club is situated at the North end of the Esplanade. Founded in 1931 as 'Shanklin Amateur Sailing Club', the club has a fleet of Sprint 15 catamarans and holds races three days a week during the season.

Further along the beach is the Fisherman's Cottage pub. This is at the bottom of Shanklin Chine, from which the town takes its name, historically "Chynklyng Chine" and in the Domesday Book of 1086 Sencliz (held by William FitzAzor; Jocelyn FitzAzor) from "Scen-hlinc". The Chine is open to the public for a small fee and continues up to Rylstone Gardens in the Old Village. It contains a small section of the pipe of the "Operation Pluto" pipeline which ran across the Isle of Wight and out from Shanklin and another branch from Sandown to supply fuel to the D-Day beaches.

Nature 
America Wood is a Site of Special Scientific Interest located between Shanklin and Whiteley Bank. It is owned by the Woodland Trust It takes a bit of stamina and determination to get into America Wood, on the outskirts of Shanklin, since it has little accessible parking. However, the more active Isle of Wight visitor can make use of public footpaths and bridleways that lead into the wood. There is an ‘open’ feel to the site with storm damage during the Great Storm of 1987 and the Burns' Day storm of 1990 felling trees and creating many open sections. There is one particularly large glade which is gradually recovering from the storms. 
The wood is situated just west of Ninham.

Dunnose is a large cape which is situated southwest of the town. An imposing and high geological feature, it has served as a triangulation point for maps of the United Kingdom, and has also been the site of several shipwrecks, most infamously that of HMS Eurydice, which sank with the loss of 300 people aboard.

Shanklin is also the location where Charles Darwin wrote his Origin of Species during an 18-month-long visit to the town.

Climate
Shanklin has an oceanic climate (Cfb) with mild summers, cool nights, rainy winters and average temperature nights. Shanklin is one of the sunniest villages in Great Britain.

Churches

There are three Anglican churches in Shanklin. St.Paul's Church in Regent Street has the bell from HMS Eurydice (1843), which sank off Dunnose Point and is the subject of a poem by Gerard Manley Hopkins. St. Blasius Church, Shanklin – better known as Shanklin Old Church – is to the south of the town and has bell ropes hanging in the nave and a fine lych-gate. The Church of St. Saviour-on-the-Cliff, Shanklin is the biggest in the town and is in Queen's Road.

The Isle of Wight United Reformed Church is situated in Shanklin.

Twin towns 
Shanklin is twinned with Coupvray, a town in the  Île-de-France region of France.

Gallery

References

External links

 Shanklin Town Council
 Shanklin Town, Accommodation Guide and Photo's
 Luccombe Hall Hotel

 
Seaside resorts in England
Beaches of the Isle of Wight
Towns on the Isle of Wight
Civil parishes in the Isle of Wight